Archigraptis limacinoides is a species of moth of the family Tortricidae. It is found in southern Vietnam.

References

Moths described in 1992
Tortricini
Moths of Asia